Fine Gardening is a magazine for gardening enthusiasts of all skill levels covering the basics of garden design with advice from horticulture experts and landscape professionals. The focus is more on ornamental plants and home landscaping rather than edible gardens. It is a bi-monthly publication of the Taunton Press published in the United States that accepts only gardening-related advertising. It is headquartered in Newtown, Connecticut.

Contents
Feature articles

Most Fine Gardening articles are how-to or instructional in nature focusing on design, techniques, plants, or garden structure and are well illustrated. What makes Fine Gardening unique among gardening magazines is that the articles are written in the first person based on personal experience by home gardeners, horticulturists, and professional landscapers.

Other regular departments

Departments such as Super Cool Plants and Plant MD are generally written by horticulture experts. Reader-submitted content is included in departments such as
Tips
Over the Fence
Garden Photo of the Day
Garden Shed

Other regular departments include:
Super Cool Plants
Plant MD
Indoor Gardening
Regional Reports
Captivating Combinations
Pronunciation guide & zone map, and
Let's Argue About Plants (based on the magazine's award winning podcast).

Contributors
Jeff Gillman
Stephanie Cohen
Richard Hawke
Jason Reeves
Stacie Crooks
Kelly Dodson
Sue Milliken

Ancillary publications
Fine Gardening magazine issues special interest magazine issue a few times each year on specialized topics such as:
 Container Gardening
 Outdoor Ideas & Solutions
 Design Ideas
 Plant Combinations
 Grow
 Starting from Seed

In addition, Fine Gardening publishes instructional books and DVDs.

Awards and recognition

 Silver Award of Achievement for Writing - Book for Home Outside by Julie Moir Messervy (2010) Garden Writers Association
 Gold Award for Best Magazine for Plant Combinations (2008) Garden Writers Association
 Silver Award for Overall Product: Magazine (2008) Garden Writers Association
 Gold Award for Best Illustration (2007) Garden Writers Association
 Silver Award for Magazine Illustration (2007) Garden Writers Association
 Gold Award for Best Writing (2006) Garden Writers Association
 Gold Award for Best Magazine for Plant Combinations (2006) Garden Writers Association
 Two Silver Awards for Magazine Writing (2006) Garden Writers Association
 Silver Award for Cover Photography (2006) Garden Writers Association
 Bronze Award of Achievement for Magazine Writing (2005) Garden Writers Association
 Bronze Award of Achievement for Photography Portfolio (2005) Garden Writers Association
 Two Awards of Achievement for Magazine Writing (2004) Garden Writers Association
 Award of Achievement for Magazine Graphic Design (2004) Garden Writers Association
 Garden Globe of Achievement for Magazine Writing (2003) Garden Writers Association
 Garden Globe of Achievement for Cover Photography (2003) Garden Writers Association

References

External links
 official website for Fine Gardening magazine

Bimonthly magazines published in the United States
Lifestyle magazines published in the United States
Magazines established in 1988
Magazines published in Connecticut